The 1900 United States presidential election in Connecticut took place on November 6, 1900, as part of the 1900 United States presidential election. Voters chose six representatives, or electors to the Electoral College, who voted for president and vice president.

Connecticut overwhelmingly voted for the Republican nominee, President William McKinley, over the Democratic nominee, former U.S. Representative and 1896 Democratic presidential nominee William Jennings Bryan. McKinley won Connecticut by a margin of 15.85% in this rematch of the 1896 presidential election. The return of economic prosperity and recent victory in the Spanish–American War helped McKinley to score a decisive victory.

Results

See also
 United States presidential elections in Connecticut

References

Connecticut
1900
1900 Connecticut elections